Van der Heck is a Dutch surname. Notable people with the surname include:

Claes Dirksz van der Heck (1595–1649), Dutch painter
Claes Jacobsz van der Heck (1575–1652), Dutch painter
Marten Heemskerck van der Heck (1620–1660), Dutch painter

Dutch-language surnames
Surnames of Dutch origin